Anolis parvauritus the giant green anole or neotropical green anole, is a species of lizard in the family Dactyloidae. The species is found in Colombia and Ecuador.

References

Anoles
Reptiles described in 1966
Reptiles of Colombia
Reptiles of Ecuador
Taxa named by Ernest Edward Williams